Nikos Kourellas (born 22 April 1993) is a Greek professional footballer who plays as a midfielder.

References

External links
Scoresway Profile
Onsports.gr Profile

1993 births
Living people
Greek footballers
Aris Thessaloniki F.C. players
AEK Athens F.C. players
Kavala F.C. players
Kalamata F.C. players
Super League Greece players
Association football midfielders
Sportspeople from Grevena
Footballers from Western Macedonia